Freund–Rubin compactification is a form of dimensional reduction in which a field theory in d-dimensional spacetime, containing gravity and some field whose field strength  is a rank s antisymmetric tensor, 'prefers' to be reduced down to a spacetime with a dimension of either s or d-s.

Derivation
Consider general relativity in d spacetime dimensions. In the presence of an antisymmetric tensor field (without external sources), the Einstein field equations, and the equations of motion for the antisymmetric tensor are

Where the stress–energy tensor takes the form 

Being a rank s antisymmetric tensor, the field strength  has a natural ansatz for its solution, proportional to the Levi-Civita tensor on some s-dimensional manifold. 

Since the field strength is nonzero only on an s-dimensional submanifold, the metric  is naturally separated into two parts, of block-diagonal form 

Having separated our d dimensional space into the product of two subspaces, Einstein's field equations allow us to solve for the curvature of these two sub-manifolds, and we find 

We find that the Ricci curvatures of the s- and (d-s)-dimensional sub-manifolds are necessarily opposite in sign. One must have positive curvature, and the other must have negative curvature, and so one of these manifolds must be compact. Consequently, at scales significantly larger than that of the compact manifold, the universe appears to have either s or (d-s) dimensions, as opposed to the underlying d.

As an important example of this, 11D-Supergravity contains a 3-form antisymmetric tensor with a 4-form field strength, and consequently prefers to compactify 7 or 4 of its space-like dimensions, so the large-scale spacetime must be either 4 or 7 dimensional, the former of which is attractive from a phenomenological perspective

Perspective from string theory
Some important examples of Freund–Rubin compactification come from looking at the behavior of branes in string theory. Similar to the way that coupling to the electromagnetic field stabilizes electrically charged particles, the presence of antisymmetric tensor fields of various rank in a string theory stabilizes branes of various dimensions. In turn, the geometry of the spacetime near stacks of branes becomes warped in such a way that Freund–Rubin compactification is realized. In Type II-B string theory, which requires ten spacetime dimensions, there is a five-form field strength  that allows for three dimensional D-branes, and the near horizon geometry of a stack of D3-branes is five-dimensional Anti-de Sitter space times a five-dimensional sphere, which is compact in five dimensions. This geometry is an important part of the AdS/CFT correspondence.

Similarly, M-theory and its low energy limit of 11D-Supergravity contain a 4-form field strength, that stabilizes M2 and M5 branes.

References

General relativity
Supersymmetry
String theory